M. M. Amin Uddin is a Bangladesh Jatiya Party politician and the former Member of Parliament of Jessore-4.

Career
Uddin was elected to parliament from Jessore-4 as a Bangladesh Jatiya Party candidate in 2001.

References

Bangladesh Jatiya Party politicians
Living people
8th Jatiya Sangsad members
Year of birth missing (living people)